Qurbān or uḍḥiyah as referred to in Islamic law, is a ritual animal sacrifice of a livestock animal during Eid al-Adha.

The concept and definition of the word is derived from the Qur'an, the sacred scripture of Muslims, and is the analog of korban in Judaism and kourbania in Christianity. While the word and concept are similar as in other Abrahamic religions, there is notably an opposition of the burnt offering, with the spoils of the sacrifice being distributed as food to the impoverished and family of the one making the offering for consumption.

A commonly used word which may encompass qurban is  uḍḥiyah. In Islamic Law, udhiyah would refer to the sacrifice of a specific animal, offered by a specific person, on specific days to seek God's pleasure and reward.

Etymology 

The word is a cognate in several Semitic languages, being composed of the triconsonantal Semitic root q-r-b (ق ر ب); meaning closeness, with the oldest attestation being the Akkadian aqriba. The word is related in spelling and meaning to the  "offering" and  "sacrifice", through the cognate Arabic triliteral as "a way or means of approaching someone" or "nearness". In no literal sense does the word mean "sacrifice" however throughout the consistence of liturgical usage in the Abrahamic faiths and near east, the word has gained an analogous meaning to fostering a closeness to God.

Qur'an and hadith 

The word qurban appears thrice in the Qur'an: once in reference to animal sacrifice and twice referring to sacrifice in the general sense of any act which may bring one closer to God. In contrast, dhabīḥah refers to normal Islamic slaughter outside the day of udhiyyah. In hadiths regarding the qurban offered during Eid al-Adha, forms of the word udhiyah are often used interchangeably with qurban.

Abel and Cain 

The word's first use in the Qur'anic story of creation pertains to the history of the offerings of Abel and Cain (Habil and Qabil). 

In the Qur'anic narrative, it is highlighted that the act of sacrifice itself with impure or impious intentions will not be accepted. Taqwa (God consciousness) is stressed as a criterion for the sacrifice bringing blessings from God, underscoring that the ritual itself may be performed in empty and hollow fashion. Abel reasons with his brother, and demonstrates resolve in his own death, vowing to not raise his hand against his own brother in defense or retaliation. Outside of the Qur'an, the offering is decreased to varying degrees. The 14th century religious scholar Ibn Kathir narrates, taking account from Isra'iliyyat, that Abel had offered a sheep whilst his brother Cain offered part of the crops of his land. The ordained procedure of God was that a fire would descend from the heavens and consume the accepted sacrifice. Accordingly, fire came down and enveloped the animal slaughtered by Abel thus accepting the sacrifice of Abel while Cain's sacrifice was rejected. This led to jealousy on the part of Cain resulting in the first human death when he murdered his brother Abel. Refusing to seek repentance for his actions, Cain was not forgiven by God and cursed.

Abraham and Ishma'el 

The practice of qurban is entwined with the religious story of the patriarch Abraham (Ibrahim), who had a dream or vision of sacrificing his son Ishma'el (Ismail). In the Qur'anic narrative, his son willingly offers himself to be sacrificed to God. Eid al-Adha honors the willingness and devotion of father and son to partake in the act as demonstration of ultimate obedience to God's command. Before the prophet could sacrifice his son, however, he was stopped and Allah provided a ram to sacrifice instead. In Tafsīr al-Jalālayn, a classical exegesis of the Qur'an, the ram itself is said to be the same one that Abel had sacrificed to God sent back from the garden of Eden. While not the only livestock acceptable, a narration in Sahih Muslim records that the Prophet Muhammad sought out horned, white rams to sacrifice during Eid al-Adha, as the ram of Abraham and Abel had been.

In commemoration of the event, specific livestock animals are sacrificed ritually for consumption. One third of their meat is consumed by the family offering the sacrifice, while the rest is distributed to the poor and needy.

Stipulations of qurban 

For the majority of Muslims, the qurban sacrifice during Eid al-Adha is highly stressed for its religious significance, but not  or compulsory by law save for in the Hanafi school of law.

The sacrifice of an animal is legal from the morning of the 10th to the sunset of the 13th Dhu l-Hijjah, the 12th lunar month of the Islamic calendar. On these days Muslims all over the world offer qurban which means a sacrifice or slaughter of an animal on specific days. There are stipulations for the animals offered; they can be sheep, goats, lambs, cows (buffalos, bulls) or camels (in strong contrast to Judaism). The animals must also be healthy, free from disease, and cannot be blind or one-eyed, missing parts of their tails or ears (docking or cropping animals ears or tails are forbidden act), and must be sacrificed in accordance with dhabihah standards. Most schools of fiqh accept that the animal must be domesticated. Moreover, Islamic law forbids stunning of animals prior to the sacrifice so animals typically have their common carotid artery severed without any form of anesthesia.

It is noteworthy that the blood of the sacrificed is discarded, and that no burnt offering analog exists in Islam. The portions of meat are divided in three; one portion goes to the needy and poor, one portion goes to the one performing the sacrifice, and another to their family. One may donate their third to whomever they choose.

See also
 Dhabihah
 Dušni Brav
 Korban

References

External links 
 Principles of Udhiyyah

Animal sacrifice
Animals in Islam
Animal rights
Animal welfare
Cruelty to animals
Eid (Islam)
Islam and society
Islamic belief and doctrine
Islamic festivals
Islamic worship
Islamic terminology
Ritual slaughter